The Collection is a compilation album released in 2003 by the Canadian-American rock band Steppenwolf.

Track listing
All songs written by John Kay, except where noted.

Personnel
John Kay: guitars, harmonica, lead vocals
Rushton Moreve: bass guitar, backing vocals (tracks 1, 3-4, 13, 18-19)
Michael Monarch: guitars, backing vocals (tracks 1-4, 13, 15, 18-19)
Goldy McJohn: Hammond organ, piano, electric piano, keyboards (tracks 1-8, 10-11, 13-15, 17-19)
Jerry Edmonton: drums, percussion, backing vocals (tracks 1-8, 10-11, 13-15, 17-19)
Nick St. Nicholas: bass guitar (tracks 2, 5, 11, 15)
Larry Byrom: guitars, backing vocals (tracks 5, 7-8, 11, 17)
George Biondo: bass guitar, backing vocals (tracks 6-10, 14, 17)
Kent Henry: guitars (tracks 6, 9)
Hugh O'Sullivan: keyboards (track 9)
Penti Glan: drums (track 9)
Bobby Cochran: guitars (tracks 10, 14)
Rocket Ritchotte: guitars, backing vocals (track 12)
Michael Wilk: bass guitar, keyboards (track 12)
Ron Hurst: drums (track 12)
Michael Palmer: guitars (track 16)
Wayne Cook: keyboards (track 16)
Kenny Blanchet: bass guitar (track 16)
Steven Palmer: drums (track 16)

References

Steppenwolf (band) compilation albums
2003 compilation albums